Kevin A. Avard (born January 25, 1963) (born 1963) is an American politician and a Republican member of the New Hampshire Senate representing District 12 since 2020 and previously between 2014 and 2018.

Education
Avard studied bible theology at Liberty University.

Politics
Avard was elected to the New Hampshire Senate in 2014, defeating incumbent Democrat Peggy Gilmour. He also defeated Gilmore in a 2016 rematch to retain his seat.  Avard again stood for election to the NH State Senate in 2018, but lost his seat to Democratic candidate Melanie Levesque. From 2010 to 2012 he was a member of the New Hampshire House of Representatives. Avard also served on the Franklin City Council from 2000 to 2002.

Electoral history

References

External links
Campaign site

Kevin Avard at Ballotpedia

1963 births
Living people
Republican Party New Hampshire state senators
Republican Party members of the New Hampshire House of Representatives
New Hampshire city council members
Politicians from Nashua, New Hampshire
Politicians from Everett, Washington
21st-century American politicians